Stefan Dodić (born 13 March 2003) is a Serbian handball player for RK Zagreb and the Serbian national team.

Honors 
RK Vardar
Macedonian Handball Super League
 - 2022
Macedonian Handball Cup
 - 2022

Individual awards 
 Most valuable player (MVP) at the 2022 European Men's U-20 Handball Championship

References

2003 births
Living people
Serbian male handball players
RK Vardar players